Dietloff Kapp (10 May 1925 – October 1986) was a German modern pentathlete. He competed at the 1952 Summer Olympics.

References

External links
 

1925 births
1986 deaths
German male modern pentathletes
Olympic modern pentathletes of Germany
Modern pentathletes at the 1952 Summer Olympics
Sportspeople from Cologne